Alexandru Kirițescu (28 March 1888 – 9 April 1961) was a Romanian playwright and journalist, best known for his 1929 play Gaiţele (The Magpies), also called Cuibul de viespi (The Wasp's Nest).

Notes

1888 births
1964 deaths
People from Pitești
Romanian journalists
Recipients of the Order of the Star of the Romanian Socialist Republic
20th-century Romanian dramatists and playwrights
20th-century journalists
Burials at Bellu Cemetery